Selkirk Secondary School is a public high school in Kimberley, British Columbia, Canada. It is a part of School District 6 Rocky Mountain.

Notable students
 Stanley Hayer
 Gerry Sorensen

External links
 Selkirk Secondary School

School reports - Ministry of Education
 Class Size
 Satisfaction Survey
 School Performance
 Skills Assessment

High schools in British Columbia
Educational institutions in Canada with year of establishment missing